Jessica Jane Eddie (born 7 October 1984 in Durham) is a British rower. She won a silver medal in the women's eight at the 2016 Olympic Games in Rio de Janeiro.

Rowing

2011
She was part of the British squad that topped the medal table at the 2011 World Rowing Championships in Bled, where she won a bronze medal as part of the eight with Alison Knowles, Jo Cook, Louisa Reeve, Natasha Page, Lindsey Maguire, Katie Greves, Victoria Thornley and Caroline O'Connor.

2014
On 17 March 2014 Eddie was part of the composite crew that won the Women's Eights Head of the River Race on the River Thames in London, setting a record time of 17:42.2 for the 4 1⁄4-mile (6.8 km) Championship Course from Mortlake to Putney. The crew comprised Heather Stanning – Army RC; Beth Rodford – Gloucester RC; Zoe Lee – Imperial College BC; Jessica Eddie – London RC; Helen Glover – Minerva Bath Rowing Club; Olivia Carnegie-Brown – Oxford Brookes University BC; Tina Stiller – Tees RC; Caragh McMurtry – Reading University BC; cox Phelan Hill – Leander Club.

On 19 April 2014 Eddie was teamed with Polly Swann for the women's pair at the British rowing trials at Caversham, where they finished 1.14 seconds behind Helen Glover and Heather Stanning.

At the British Rowing Championships on 18–19 October at Holme Pierrepont (Nottingham), Eddie was part of the composite crew that won gold in both the women's fours sweep event and the quad sculls. Racing under the acronym LIMA, the crew comprised: Jessica Eddie – London RC; Zoe Lee – Imperial College BC; Helen Glover – Minerva-Bath RC; and Heather Stanning – Army RC.

2015
On 14 March 2015 Eddie was part of the composite crew that won the Women's Eights Head of the River Race on the River Thames in London, setting a time of 18:58.6 for the 4 1⁄4-mile (6.8 km) Championship Course from Mortlake to Putney. The crew comprised Heather Stanning – Army RC; Helen Glover – Minerva-Bath RC; Zoe Lee – Imperial College BC; Katherine Grainger – Marlow RC; Melanie Wilson; Caragh McMurtry – Southampton Coalporters ARC; Olivia Carnegie-Brown – Oxford Brookes University BC; Jessica Eddie – London RC; cox Phelan Hill – Leander Club.

On 19 April 2015 Eddie and Louisa Reeve finished second in women's pair at the British rowing trials at Caversham, behind Helen Glover and Heather Stanning. They were followed by Katie Greves & Zoe Lee.

2016
On 8 May 2016 Eddie and the GBR eight won the European Championship gold medal in Brandenburg, Germany. Narrowly beating a Netherlands and Romania crew in extremely windy conditions.
The eight went on to win two silver World Cup medals in 2016, one 0.2 seconds behind the US in Lucerne and a second behind New Zealand in Poznan.

References

External links
 

1984 births
Living people
English female rowers
Sportspeople from Durham, England
Rowers at the 2008 Summer Olympics
Rowers at the 2012 Summer Olympics
Rowers at the 2016 Summer Olympics
Olympic rowers of Great Britain
World Rowing Championships medalists for Great Britain
Olympic silver medallists for Great Britain
Medalists at the 2016 Summer Olympics
Olympic medalists in rowing
European Rowing Championships medalists
Stewards of Henley Royal Regatta